William Alfred Blackman (6 August 1895 – 29 September 1969) was an Australian rules footballer who played with Carlton in the Victorian Football League (VFL).

Family
The son of Robert James Blackman (1855-1926), and Margaret Ellen Blackman (1857-1912), née Peterson, William Alfred Blackman was born in Brunswick, Victoria on 6 August 1895.

Military service
He served in the First AIF, enlisting in September 1915. He was wounded in action on three separate occasions. He returned to Australia in December 1918, and was discharged in March 1919.

Football

Carlton (VFL)
Recruited from Brunswick Juniors, he played 54 games with Carlton over five seasons. He played representative football against New South Wales, in Sydney, on 8 July 1922.

Brunswick (VFA)
On 20 May 1925, Blackman was cleared from Carlton to play with the Brunswick Football Club in the Victorian Football Association (VFA). Overall, he played 22 games with Brunswick over two seasons (1925-1926), including its 1925 premiership team (he was one of Bruswick's best players); and for a time in 1926, he served as the team's captain.

Birchip (NCDFL)
On 27 April 1927, Blackman was cleared from Brunswick to play with the Birchip Football Club in the North Central District Football League.

Coburg (VFA)
He played in two matches for the Coburg Football Club in the VFA competition in 1928.

Notes

References	
 
 World War One Service Record: Private William Alfred Blackman (4145), National Archives of Australia.
 World War Nominal Roll: Private William Alfred Blackman (4145), Australian War Memorial.
 World War Embarkation Roll: Private William Alfred Blackman (4145), Australian War Memorial.

External links 

	

Billy Blackman's profile at Blueseum

1895 births
Australian rules footballers from Melbourne
Carlton Football Club players
Australian military personnel of World War I
1969 deaths
People from Brunswick, Victoria
Military personnel from Melbourne